Ilse Warringa (born June 1, 1975) is a Dutch actress and voice actress who has voiced for Dutch dubs of cartoons for Nickelodeon, SDI Media and Wim Pel Productions.

Biography
Ilse was born on June 1, 1975 in Dalfsen and followed her stage training at the Academy of Arts in Kampen/Zwolle, where she graduated in 1998. She also studied vocals-light music at the Conservatory in Zwolle. Directly  after her graduation she came contact Theatre Group Stella Den Haag from 1998 to date, where they acted in the performances the year of the Hare (2003, winner 1000 watt-price), In the nests in collaboration with the Residentie Orchestra (2007 and 2010, conducted by Jurjen Hempel), as well as the very successful Shaffy for children (2010).
In between, she played in a wide variety of productions at several music-theatre groups such as the Branch Office, theatre group mutually, Theater Sonnevanck and Oorkaan. Warringa joined in 2006  the Winx Club cast, replacing for Karin van As in  the character voicing Icy from season 3 to 5 and 6.

She was one of the creators of the television series De Luizenmoeder, of which its first season aired in 2018. She was also a screenwriter and actor, playing the character Ank.

Filmography
Different roles in sketches of Het Klokhuis
Sissi (Dutch remake) - Néné and Mother of Franz Joseph
Juf Ank in Dutch series De Luizenmoeder

Dubbing

Animation
Winx Club - Icy (Seasons 3, 5-6)
Winx Club: The Secret of the Lost Kingdom - Icy
Winx Club 3D: Magical Adventure - Icy
Kung Fu Panda - Tiger
Marting Morning - Titelsinger

Live action
iCarly - Ms Briggs

Tv-commercials
Rabobank
LOI
De Meisjes van Verkade

References

Links

Ilse Warringa on Twitter

1975 births
Living people
Dutch voice actresses
People from Dalfsen